Molla Vali (also Romanized as Mollā Valī) is a village in Qaleh-ye Khvajeh Rural District, in the Central District of Andika County, Khuzestan Province, Iran. At the 2006 census, its population was 120, in 19 families.

References 

Populated places in Andika County